Sir James Morgan, 4th Baronet of Llantarnam (1643 – 30 April 1718) was the younger son of Sir Edward Morgan, 1st Baronet.

Morgan was born at Llantarnam Abbey, Llanvihangel Llantarnam, Monmouthshire, Wales. His first wife, Alice (or Anne), was the daughter of a Judge Hopton and the widow of Nicholas Jones.

Upon the death of his nephew, Sir Edward, Morgan inherited the baronetcy but not his nephew's estate.  His nephew considered him "a violent zealot" for the Church of Rome and was careful to prevent Morgan's succeeding to the estate; it went to Sir Edward's daughter Frances (Morgan) Bray.  Morgan was the last to hold the baronetcy, as his surviving heirs migrated to the Thirteen Colonies.

He died in Wales.

Ancestry

References

1643 births
1718 deaths
Baronets in the Baronetage of England
Welsh Roman Catholics